Spun is the third studio album by Keller Williams, released in 1998.

Track listing
 Running On Fumes 5:23 
 Tribe 4:46 
 Blazeabago 5:32 
 Thirsty In The Rain 3:42 
 221" 3:51 
 Stargate 5:17 
 Spun 2:21 
 In A Big Country 3:47 
 Portapotty 4:00 
 Theme From The Pink Panther 2:59 
 Sleeping Giant 3:54 
 Dear Emily 2:39 
 Fat B 2:43

Credits
Big Country - Performer
Scott Harris - Bass  
Henry Mancini - Performer  
Peter Rowan - Performer  
Jack Ryan - Photography  
Jay V Rizzi - Cover design
Keller Williams - Bongos, Conga, Vocals, Guitar (10 String), Djembe

References

1998 albums
Keller Williams albums